New Jersey's 14th Legislative District is one of 40 in the New Jersey Legislature, covering the Mercer County municipalities of East Windsor Township, Hamilton Township, Hightstown Borough and Robbinsville Township; and the Middlesex County municipalities of Cranbury Township, Jamesburg Borough, Monroe Township, Plainsboro Township and Spotswood Borough as of the 2011 apportionment.

Demographic characteristics
As of the 2020 United States census, the district had a population of 234,184, of whom 187,321 (80.0%) were of voting age. The racial makeup of the district was 133,182 (56.9%) White, 20,057 (8.6%) African American, 891 (0.4%) Native American, 43,737 (18.7%) Asian, 71 (0.0%) Pacific Islander, 18,792 (8.0%) from some other race, and 17,454 (7.5%) from two or more races. Hispanic or Latino of any race were 36,123 (15.4%) of the population.

The district had 177,324 registered voters as of December 1, 2021, of whom 69,493 (39.2%) were registered as unaffiliated, 67,738 (38.2%) were registered as Democrats, 37,866 (21.4%) were registered as Republicans, and 2,227 (1.3%) were registered to other parties.

Political representation
For the 2022–2023 session, the district is represented in the State Senate by Linda R. Greenstein (D, Plainsboro Township) and in the General Assembly by Daniel R. Benson (D, Hamilton Township) and Wayne DeAngelo (D, Hamilton Township).

The legislative district overlaps with the New Jersey's 3rd and 12th congressional districts.

1965–1973
In the interim period between the 1964 Supreme Court decision Reynolds v. Sims which required the creation of state legislature districts to be made as equal in population as possible and the 1973 creation of the 40-district map, the 14th District consisted of all of Passaic County. For the Senate, two members were elected at-large in the 1965 election for a two-year term, while three members were elected in 1967 for a four-year term and 1971 for a two-year term.

The members elected to the Senate from this district are as follows:

For the members of the Assembly elected from Passaic County, the election method changed in every general election during this interim period. In 1967, two members were elected at-large from the entire county, while the county was split into three Assembly districts with one member elected from each district. Then in the 1969 election, one member was elected at-large and two Assembly districts in the county each elected two members. The election of 1971 reverted to the original 1967 method of electing Assembly members.

The members elected to the Assembly from each district are as follows:

District composition since 1973
When the 40-district legislative map was created in 1973, the 14th District originally included municipalities in western Morris County, all of Hunterdon County, New Jersey, save for Readington Township, in Mercer County Ewing Township, Hopewell and Princeton townships and their enclosed boroughs, and Plainsboro and Cranbury townships in Middlesex. It took on a shape similar to its current configuration in 1981 when the 14th stretched from Hamilton, up eastern Mercer County, southwestern Middlesex, and Rocky Hill, Millstone, Manville, and Franklin Township in Somerset County. In the 1991 redistricting, the Somerset County portions of the district were removed but Monroe Township, Jamesburg, and Helmetta were added to the district. Washington Township, East Windsor, Hightstown, and Helmetta were removed from the district in the 2001 redistricting; the Hamilton Township-Middlesex County connection was made through West Windsor Township. East Windsor, Hightstown, and Robbinsville (renamed in 2007 from Washington Township) were restored to the district in the 2011 redistricting, West Windsor and South Brunswick were shifted to other districts, and Spotswood was added to the 14th for the first time.

Election history

Election results, 1973–present

Senate

General Assembly

Election results, 1965–1973

Senate

General Assembly

District 14 At-large

District 14A

District 14B

District 14C

References

Mercer County, New Jersey
Middlesex County, New Jersey
14